Change Grow Live (CGL) is a voluntary sector organisation specialising in substance misuse and criminal justice intervention projects in England and Wales. All of its funding is statutory-based. As of 2012 the organisation employed over 1,800 workers and was supported by over 250 volunteers. CGL was formerly named Crime Reduction Initiatives (CRI), but changed its name in 2016.

History
The organisation traces its origins to a prisoner rehabilitation charity established in 1880.

Services
CGL is a national provider of support, treatment and rehabilitation programmes for those with substance misuse problems, crime and lack of opportunity. CGL's service users include:

Adults and young people with substance misuse problems
People who are homeless and living and working on the streets
Offenders in prison and those serving community sentences
Families and communities affected by crime, substance misuse and anti-social behaviour
Victims of domestic abuse

CGL services include: Key-work sessions, Counselling, Benefits and housing advice, Outreach, Mutual Aid meetings (such as SMART Recovery, Narcotics Anonymous), Needle exchange, Sexual Health awareness, Medical assistance, Prescribing, Complementary therapies and general support in living a healthy and balanced life.  CGL partners with many agencies to provide treatment and co-ordinated care pathways that include housing, employment, education and training.

CGL have a variety of different services across the nation. Notable services include their Wirral Ways to Recovery which featured in the 2022 BBC documentary, Addiction: The Recovery. The documentary followed two service users over the period of a year and looked into the "Recovery Village" that Wirral Ways to Recovery and Change Grow Live have set up in Birkenhead.

In the 2000–01 financial year, CGL's income was £2.1m. In 2011–12 it was £80.8m.

External links
 Official Site

References 

Charities based in England
Addiction organisations in the United Kingdom